James Middleton Dyson (4 March 1907 – 2000) was an English professional footballer who played as a winger.

References

1907 births
2000 deaths
People from the City of Lancaster
English footballers
Association football wingers
Park Villa F.C. players
British Dyestuffs F.C. players
Northwich Victoria F.C. players
Oldham Athletic A.F.C. players
Grimsby Town F.C. players
Nottingham Forest F.C. players
Accrington Stanley F.C. (1891) players
English Football League players